Walt Disney's It's a Small World of Fun! is a series of DVDs by Walt Disney Home Entertainment. Each release would feature around one hour of Disney animated short films with international settings. As opposed to the chronological nature of the Walt Disney Treasures line, each release would feature various cartoons in no particular order. The series featured two waves of releases, on May 16, 2006, and February 13, 2007.

Releases

Wave One
The first wave of two releases came on May 16, 2006.

Volume 1
The Flying Gauchito (1945)
In Dutch (1946)
Goliath II (1960)
Mickey Down Under (1948)
African Diary (1945)
A Cowboy Needs a Horse (1956)
Grievance of a Starmaker (2002)

Volume 2
Pedro (1955)
The Olympic Champ (1942)
Peter and the Wolf (1946)
Brave Little Tailor (1938)
Crazy with the Heat (1947)
Susie the Little Blue Coupe (1952)

Wave Two
The second wave of four releases came on February 13, 2007.

Volume 3
The Legend of Johnny Appleseed (1948)
Pueblo Pluto (1949)
Tiger Trouble (1945)
The Fox Hunt (1938)
Alpine Climbers (1936)
Hello Aloha (1952)

Volume 4
The Reluctant Dragon (1941)
Polar Trappers (1938)
The Goddess of Spring (1934)
For Whom the Bulls Toil (1953)
The Little House (1952)

External links 
 

Home video lines
Disney home video releases
2000s Disney animated short films
Short film compilations